The John Konrads Show is an Australian television series which aired 1960 to 1961. It was produced in Sydney, where it aired on TCN-9, while in Melbourne it aired on HSV-7 (this was prior to the creation of the Seven Network and Nine Network).  It was a half-hour music show aimed at teenagers, and hosted by swimmer John Konrads.

Reception
Australian Women's Weekly called it "well-produced" and said of Konrads "He handles his performers and televiewers with a great deal more charm than many comperes much older in years and experience".

References

External links
The John Konrads Show on IMDb

1960 Australian television series debuts
1961 Australian television series endings
Australian music television series
English-language television shows
Black-and-white Australian television shows
Pop music television series